Selahattin Paşalı (born 2 February 1990) is a Turkish actor.

Life and career 
Paşalı was born on 2 February 1990 in Bodrum. He joined Darüşşafaka Sports Club at the age of 14 and served as a team captain during his time there. He completed his education by studying Art Management in Budapest. Then he got acting training in Craft Atölye. He made his television debut in 2017 with Show TV series Kalp Atışı. The next year he was cast in the TV series Bir Umut Yeter. In 2019, he acted in Kanal D series Leke. In 2020, he appeared in a recurring role in the TV series Babil, starring Halit Ergenç and Ozan Güven. Paşalı's breakthrough came in the same year after appearing in a main role in Netflix original series Aşk 101, portraying the character of Osman.
Then he acted in the Netflix series Midnight at the Pera Palace.

Filmography

Television

Film

Web series

References

External links 

 
 

1990 births
Turkish male television actors
21st-century Turkish male actors
People from Bodrum
Living people